Omar & Salma 2 ( is the sequel to the film Omar & Salma starring Tamer Hosny & Mai Ezz Eldin.

References

External links

2000s Arabic-language films
2009 films
Egyptian comedy-drama films
Films about infidelity